Amarynthis is a monotypic genus of butterflies in the family Riodinidae. Its sole species, Amarynthis meneria, the meneria metalmark, is a common species in lowland rainforests east of the Andes from Venezuela, Suriname and Guyana, south through the Brazilian Amazon to Peru and northern Argentina.

External links
Amarynthis meneria at the Tree of Life Web Project
Species info

Riodinini
Riodinidae of South America
Taxa named by Jacob Hübner
Monotypic butterfly genera